Anna Louise Birgitte Syberg (7 January 1870 – 4 July 1914) was a Danish painter. Together with her husband Fritz Syberg, she was one of  the  Funen Painters  (Fynboerne) who lived and worked on the island of Funen. She is remembered for her lively watercolours of flower arrangements.

Biography

Anna Syberg was born in  Faaborg, Denmark. Her father was artist Peter Syrak Hansen (1833-1904). 
She was the sister of artist Peter Hansen (1868–1928).

Anna Syberg attended the technical school in Faaborg after which she studied painting under Ludvig Brandstrup and Karl Jensen in Copenhagen. In 1882, she met Fritz Syberg who was serving an apprenticeship as a house painter with her father Peter Syrak Hansen. The two quickly fell for each other and after Anna had spent a period decorating porcelain at the Royal Copenhagen factory, they married in 1894 and set up home in the little village of Svanninge, just north of Faaborg. In 1902, they moved to Pilegården near Kerteminde, also on the island of Funen, where Anna became a close friend of Johannes Larsen, another member of the Fynboerne group of artists. From 1910 to 1913, the family spent three years at Pisa in Italy.

From 1898, Anna Syberg exhibited at Charlottenborg and in 1912 her works were presented at Den Frie Udstilling. She was frequently a model for her husband and appears in several of his works. During her lifetime, she received little recognition for her work, often being referred to as a flower painter. This was probably due to the fact that it was difficult for women artists to enter what was essentially a men's world.

Personal life
Anna Syberg was the mother of several children including artist Ernst Syberg  (1906–1981), composer Franz Syberg (1904-1955) and actress  Johanne Marie Birgitte Giersing (1896–1944).

Anna Syberg  died in Copenhagen and was buried at Faaborg.

References

1870 births
1914 deaths
19th-century Danish painters
20th-century Danish painters
People from Faaborg-Midtfyn Municipality
People from Kerteminde Municipality
19th-century Danish women artists
20th-century Danish women artists
20th-century Danish artists
Danish women painters